Ricardo Javier "Murmullo" Perdomo Moreira (3 July 1960 – 12 August 2022) was a Uruguayan football player and head coach. He played for clubs in Uruguay, Argentina, Chile, and Spain.

Death
Perdomo died in August 2022, at the age of 62.

Honours
Unión Española
 Copa Chile 1992, 1993

References

External links
 
 
 
 

1960 births
2022 deaths
People from San José Department
Uruguayan footballers
Association football midfielders
Uruguay international footballers
Pan American Games gold medalists for Uruguay
Medalists at the 1983 Pan American Games
Footballers at the 1983 Pan American Games
Pan American Games medalists in football
Segunda División players
Club Nacional de Football players
Rayo Vallecano players
Deportivo Mandiyú footballers
Unión Española footballers
Club Atlético River Plate footballers
Club Deportivo Palestino footballers
Rampla Juniors players
Uruguayan football managers
Club Plaza Colonia de Deportes managers
Uruguayan expatriate footballers
Uruguayan expatriate sportspeople in Chile
Expatriate footballers in Chile
Uruguayan expatriate sportspeople in Argentina
Expatriate footballers in Argentina
Uruguayan expatriate sportspeople in Spain
Expatriate footballers in Spain
Montevideo City Torque managers